The 2002 FIA Sportscar Championship was the second season of the FIA Sportscar Championship, an auto racing series regulated by the Fédération Internationale de l'Automobile and organized by the International Racing Series Ltd.  It was the sixth season of the series dating back to the International Sports Racing Series of 1997. The series featured sports prototypes in two categories, SR1 and SR2, and awarded championships for drivers, teams, and manufacturers in each respective category.  The series began on 7 April 2002 and ended on 22 September 2002 after six races held in Europe.

The SR1 championships were won by Jan Lammers' Racing for Holland outfit, sharing the drivers' championship with Val Hillebrand and securing Dome their first title outside Japan.  Italian Lucchini Engineering earned the SR2 titles for their own team and chassis; Mirko Savoldi and Pierguiseppe Peroni won the drivers championship for the team.

Schedule
Although initially planned to match the length of the 2001 calendar at eight events, the 2002 calendar for the championship was shortened following several cancellations mid-season.  The 1000 km endurance race at Monza was dropped in the initial calendar, meaning all races were set to a limit of 2 hours and 30 minutes.  Barcelona, Spa, Brno, Magny-Cours, and the Nürburgring were all retained from 2001, while Imola, Rockingham, and Autódromo do Estoril were all scheduled to debut in the series.  Later cancellations of the Imola and Rockingham rounds were replaced by a new event at Dijon, while the Nürburgring event was also canceled as the season progressed.  The end of the event at Rockingham made this the only season of the championship not to feature an event held in the United Kingdom.

Entries

SR1

SR2

Results and standings

Race results

Points were awarded to the top eight finishers in each category.  Entries were required to complete 60% of the race distance in order to be classified as a finisher and earn points.  Drivers were required to complete 20% of the total race distance for their car to earn points.  Teams scored points for only their highest finishing entry.

Driver championships

SR1
The SR1 class of the 2002 FIA Sportscar Championship for Drivers was won by Val Hillerbrand and Jan Lammers sharing a Dome-Judd entered by Racing for Holland.

SR2
The SR2 class of the 2002 FIA Sportscar Championship for Drivers was won by Piergiuseppe Peroni and Mirko Savoldi sharing a Lucchini-Alfa Romeo entered by Lucchini Engineering.

Team championships

SR1

SR2

Constructors championships

SR1
Dome were awarded the SR1 constructors championship by tie-breaker for their three victories against Courage's two.

SR2

References

External links
 2002 FIA Classifications Retrieved from web.archive.org on 30 November 2008
 World Sports Racing Prototypes - Season results
 2002 FIA Sportscar Championship results Retrieved from www.teamdan.com on 30 November 2008
 FIA Sportscar Championship images Retrieved from www.racingsportscars.com on 30 November 2008

FIA Sportscar Championship
FIA Sportscar Championship